The 1962 Ibero-American Games were held at the Estadio de Vallehermoso in Madrid, Spain, between October 7–12, 1962.

A total of 31 events were contested, 22 by men and 9 by women.

Medal summary
Medal winners were published.

Men

Women

Medal table (unofficial)

Team trophies
The placing table for team trophy awarded to the 1st place overall team (men and women) was published.

Overall

Participation
A total number of 349 athletes (287 men and 62 women) from 17 countries was reported to participate in the event.  

 Perú

References

Ibero-American Championships in Athletics
Athletics in Spain
1962 in athletics (track and field)
1962 in Spanish sport
October 1962 sports events in Europe